Vinexin is a protein that in humans is encoded by the SORBS3 gene.

Interactions
SORBS3 has been shown to interact with DLG5 and MAPK1.

References

Further reading

External links